Gorgopis limbopuncta is a species of moth of the family Hepialidae. It is known from South Africa.

References

External links
Hepialidae genera

Moths described in 1930
Hepialidae